FBOY Island, or FBoy Island, is an American dating reality television series which focuses on three women trying to identify 24 men as either womanizers ("fboys") or seeking a serious relationship ("nice guys"). The series is hosted by Nikki Glaser and premiered on July 29, 2021, on HBO Max. In August 2021, the series was renewed for a second season, which premiered on July 14, 2022. In December 2022, the series was cancelled, with STXalternative planning to shop the series elsewhere. It was also removed from the streaming service as well. In March 2023, The CW picked up the show for a third season, along with a spinoff, FGIRL Island.

Premise 
Hosted by comedian Nikki Glaser, the show centers on three female contestants and 24 male counterparts. Of the men, 12 are self-professed nice guys, while the other half identify as fboys, the former being interested in forming a relationship and splitting the $100,000 prize, while the latter are competing for all of the $100,000 cash prize. During the progression of each episode, the women select men to go out with, all ranging between the ages of 22 to 35. The ending of the episode consisting of three men being chosen to be eliminated and afterwards revealing if they are a nice guy or not. While the nice guys that are eliminated are sent to a mansion called "Nice Guy Grotto" in a limousine, the fboys, sometimes also called Lotharios, are sent to "Limbro". This place lacks luxury and consists of huts made from bamboo, cots and hay-filled pillows. At some point in the first half of the series, the remaining male contestants reveal their own labels to the women and audience. During the complete run of the show, only the abbreviated form, fboy, is used by the contestants and host.

Apart from being entertainment, creator Elan Gale has stated that the show's alternative purpose is "to try to see if people can change for the right person," with the playboys becoming better partners and the "nice guys" getting recognition for their personality.

Season 1

The leading ladies for Season One were CJ Franco, a 30-year-old content creator and model from Los Angeles, CA; Sarah Emig, a 25-year-old social media manager from Chicago; and Nakia Renee, a 28-year-old hair and makeup stylist, singer, and songwriter from Los Angeles, CA.

For Season One, the contestants knew that there was a substantial amount of money on the line ($100,000 per woman), but were not told the rules for how the money would be distributed other than a suggestion that it would depend in part on whether the woman ultimately made a nice guy or an fboy their final choice.  During the final reveal in episode 10, host Nikki Glaser informed the remaining contestants that if a female contestant made a nice guy her final choice, the two of them would split the $100,000 evenly, but if she chose an fboy, then he would be given the option to split the money and continue the relationship or end the relationship and keep the entire $100,000 themselves. However, this was a lie. When Sarah picked Garrett Morosky and he chose the latter, Glaser went back on her word and declared that the money would instead go to a charity of Sarah's choice.

Contestants

*Garrett chose to keep all of the cash prize, but he was not given it.

**Jared chose to split the cash prize.

Contestant Progress

Competition
 The Nice Guy was CJ's final choice, and received half of the prize money
 The FBoy was Nakia's final choice, and chose to split the money with her
 The FBoy was Sarah's final choice, chose to keep all of the money for himself and lost it to a charity of her choice
 The contestant escaped Limbro and returned to the game
 The contestant entered the competition
 The contestant was in CJ's bottom two
 The contestant was in Nakia's bottom two
 The contestant was in Sarah's bottom two
 The contestant was eliminated by CJ
 The contestant was eliminated by Nakia
 The contestant was eliminated by Sarah
 The contestant left the show for medical reasons
 The contestant was brought back as a guest

Season 2
The leading ladies for Season Two were Mia Emani Jones, a 26-year-old dental student and former pageant queen from Tampa, FL, Louise Barnard, a 25-year-old model from Michigan, and Tamaris Sepulveda, a 29-year-old account executive from The Bronx.

Responding to the controversy that arose after the Season One finale, when Garrett Morosky chose to end the relationship with Sarah Emig and keep the $100,000, but it was instead given to a charity of Sarah's choice, host Nikki Glaser announced that in Season Two if an fboy was selected as the final suitor by one of the women but chose the money over the relationship, they would be allowed to keep the money.

Season Two included several callbacks to Season One.  Peter Park, who was eliminated in Episode One of Season One as a self-declared fboy, returned in Season 2 claiming to have reformed due to his experience in Limbro during Season 1. Season One's "ultimate fboy" Garrett Morosky returned at the end of Episode One as the "King of Limbro," greeting eliminated fboys as they entered Limbro.  And in the biggest twist, Season One finalist Casey Johnson, who entered Season One as a self-declared fboy but left as "reformed fboy" after announcing that he would have opted to split the money with CJ Franco if he had been her final choice, returned as a self-declared Nice Guy at the beginning of Episode Three.

Contestants

Contestant Progress

Competition
 This guy was Mia's final choice.
 The contestant was in Mia's bottom two.
 The contestant was eliminated by Mia.
 This guy was Louise's final choice.
 The contestant was in Louise's bottom two.
 The contestant was eliminated by Louise.
 This guy was Tamaris's final choice.
 The contestant was in Tamaris's bottom two.
 The contestant was eliminated by Tamaris.
 The contestant escaped Limbro and returned to the game.
 The contestant entered the competition.
 The contestant chose to take himself out of the running.
 The contestant was brought back as a guest.

Production 
HBO Max's first reality television dating show was created by The Bachelor producer Elan Gale and showrun by Sam Dean, who also worked another HBO Max production, 12 Dates of Christmas. Host Nikki Glaser also serves as an executive producer, as do Ben Bitoni, Sam Dean, Elan Gale and Jason Goldberg. The title comes from the slang term fuck boy, used to refer to a male womanizer, while the decision to abbreviate the term reflected the intention to make the show family-friendly. For her part, Glaser changed the meaning of fboy to mean "fragile boy", explaining that they have low self-esteem and therefore lack care toward women.

The series was filmed in the Cayman Islands, in part due to "its low number of COVID-19 cases" with the cast having to arrive at Grand Cayman 14 days before shooting commenced in March 2021 to quarantine and be tested for COVID-19 on alternate days until April. HBO Max marketed it as "a social experiment that asks the age-old question: Can FBoys truly reform, or do Nice Guys always finish last?"

It premiered on the streaming service on July 29, 2021, with the simultaneous release of its first three episodes, followed every Thursday at midnight, with another three being released on August 5 and the final four on August 12. Upon release, it became the streaming service's most-watched reality program. On August 18, 2021, HBO Max renewed the series for a second season.

On December 5, 2022, HBO Max cancelled the series, with the show's production company, STXalternative, shopping it to other networks and platforms. On March 16, 2023, it was reported that The CW had picked up the show for a third season, along with a spinoff titled FGIRL Island.

International releases 
In the UK, BBC Three acquired the show. On April 28, 2022, HBO Max announced local versions for Denmark, Sweden, Spain, and The Netherlands.

Adaptations
A New Zealander adaptation began airing on TVNZ in October 2022, hosted by Shav Ruakere and filmed in the Cook Islands. One of the male contestants named Wayde Moore was edited out of the show prior to the premiere after it was learned that he had been on trial for attempted suffocation of a drunken woman; he was found not guilty but the judge described his behavior as “deeply inappropriate and disrespectful”.  

An Australian adaptation was greenlight by Foxtel in October 2022 and will air on their streaming service, Binge, in 2023, set to be hosted by Abbie Chatfield.

Reception 
Salon.com's Kylie Chung called the show "highly self-aware and entertainingly self-deprecating," while pointing out its central theme of "couple goals", when the female contestants choose their partners. In a separate Salon.com review Melanie McFarland commented that the show "flaunts its identity as the messy, issues-burdened lovechild of dating app culture as brightly as a neon wristband," mentioning that it is destined for both fans as well as critiques as the genre, such as commenting that the women shrug off the misogyny the men express and hoping they can alter their behavior." Lea Palmieri, writing for Decider, stated that it "feels like a modern dating show throughout" since "it takes itself less seriously and celebrates how silly it is that this show even exists." The Washington Post's Inkoo Kang commented that it "works so well because it takes the 'fboy' part seriously: They're there to be ogled, judged and ultimately taken down a peg" which creates "something encouraging about a show that isn't just about whether a woman can find a man, but the right one for her." For her part, Time's Judy Berman, in a two-show review of the series and Sexy Beasts, commented on the former that it "happens to be a funny, addictive, shrewdly executed twist on a familiar format. I can't say the same for Beasts," and calling the female contestants "relatively intelligent and perceptive, but also generally have each other's backs." The AV Club's Danette Chaves concurred with Berman, calling the women "likable and clear-eyed about the choices they're making," concluding that the show "is a work in progress, but still worth checking out."

Other critics were not as favorable, such as Variety's Caroline Framke, who started her review by stating that "[i]t didn't take long for FBoy Island to make me feel like my brain was leaking out my ears, drip by stupefied drip," calling the use of the abbreviated term fboys "one of [HBO Max's] most baffling, annoying mysteries." For her part, Alessa Dominguez of Buzzfeed News called it "an anemic Bachelorette", observing the lack of time "to get to know anyone … and the guys all play even bigger caricatures of the types favored by the typical reality show," calling the men "even more one-dimensional than the women." Metro Weekly's André Hereford partly agreed with Berman, Chaves and Dominguez's characterizations of the female contestants stating, "[they] are all likable, but they don't make astute choices," giving the show two out of five stars for "[saving] a few jaw-dropping twists till the end, which might be too late for some who have already escaped to more inviting shores." While The Daily Beast's Cheyenne Roundtree was more complimentary towards the show's concept, she went on to state that it "somehow manages to teeter between an exciting, funny concept and a half-baked idea that needs to work out its kinks," the latter referring to scenes such as when the remaining contestants reveal their label and yet the women continue to foster relationships with some of the fboys. Megan Reynolds of Jezebel stated that "dating shows are past the point of reinvention," with the "[attempt] to place the power back in the hands of the women, a limp gesture towards something that could be called feminism."

Notes

References

External links 

 
 FBoy Island: The Podcast on Google Podcasts
 
 
 
 
 

American dating and relationship reality television series
2020s American reality television series
2021 American television series debuts
English-language television shows
HBO Max original programming
Television series about couples
Television shows set on islands
Television shows filmed in the Cayman Islands